This is a list of former cantons of France.

See List of cantons of France for cantons following the French canton reorganisation which came into effect in March 2015.

Cantons of France